The Italian Academy of Orthodontic Technology is a professional association for orthodontic technicians based in Italy.

Council 
The academy is run by a council, of which current members include Stefano Pandolfi (president), Sergio Paludetti (secretary) and Paolo Tedesco (treasurer).

Annual congress
Each year, the AIOT holds a national congress alongside that of the Italian Academy of Orthodontics (Accademia Italiana di Ortodonzia, AIDOR) in a major Italian city such as Rome, Florence or Bologna.

The academy also holds a congress alongside the Italiani Association Orthodontic Specialists (Associazione Specialisti Italiani Ortodonzia, ASIO) congress.

References

External links
AIOT website
ORTEC website

Medical and health organisations based in Italy
Orthodontic organizations
Organisations based in Bologna